Not Guilty is a 1921 American silent mystery film directed by Sidney Franklin and starring Sylvia Breamer, Richard Dix and Molly Malone.

Cast
 Sylvia Breamer as Elsa Chetwood
 Richard Dix as Paul / Arthur Ellison
 Molly Malone as Margy Ellison
 Elinor Hancock as 	Mrs. Ellison
 Herbert Prior as 	Newell Craig
 Lloyd Whitlock as Frank Mallow
 Alberta Lee as 	Martha
 Charles West as Herbert Welch
 Alice Forbes as Viginia Caldwell

References

Bibliography
 Munden, Kenneth White. The American Film Institute Catalog of Motion Pictures Produced in the United States, Part 1. University of California Press, 1997.

External links
 

1920s American films
1921 films
1921 mystery films
1920s English-language films
American silent feature films
American mystery films
American black-and-white films
Films directed by Sidney Franklin
First National Pictures films
Films based on American novels